The 2015 Extreme Sailing Series was the ninth edition of the sailing series and the fifth year of it being a fully global event. The series started in Singapore on 5 February 2015 and ended in Sydney, Australia on 13 December 2015 and took place in 8 cities across 3 continents.

Acts

Act 1: Singapore 
For the second time, the first act of the series was held in Singapore between 5–8 February 2015.

Act 2: Muscat, Oman 
The second act of the series was held in Muscat, Oman on the weekend of 11–14 March 2015.

Act 3: Qingdao, China 
Qingdao, China was the host of the third act of the 2015 series, on the weekend of 30 April–3 May 2015.

Act 4: Cardiff, UK 
The fourth act of 2015 was in Cardiff, Wales for the fourth time, but rather than the August Bank Holiday, it was held on the weekend of 18–21 June 2015.

Act 5: Hamburg, Germany 
Hamburg, Germany was a new venue for the series, and was held on 23–26 July 2015.

Act 6: Saint Petersburg, Russia 
The sixth act was held in Saint Petersburg, Russia, a new venue in the Extreme Sailing Series. It was held on the weekend of 20–23 August 2015.

Act 7: Istanbul, Turkey 
The seventh act took place in Istanbul, Turkey on the weekend of 1–4 October 2015.

Act 8: Sydney, Australia 
Act 8 was held on the weekend of 10–13 December 2015 in Sydney, Australia. This was the second year that Sydney hosted the series.

Results 

 = Redress given

References

External links 
 
 Official gallery

2015
2015 in sailing
2015 in Singaporean sport
2015 in Omani sport
2015 in Chinese sport
2015 in German sport
2015 in Welsh sport
2015 in Russian sport
2015 in Turkish sport
2015 in Australian sport
Sports competitions in Cardiff